Črni Potok pri Dragi is a small settlement on the left bank of the Čabranka River in the Municipality of Loški Potok in southern Slovenia, right on the border with Croatia. The area is part of the traditional region of Lower Carniola and is now included in the Southeast Slovenia Statistical Region.

Name
The name of the settlement was changed from Črni Potok to Črni Potok pri Dragi in 1953. In the past the German name was Schwarzenbach.

References

External links
Črni Potok pri Dragi on Geopedia

Populated places in the Municipality of Loški Potok